David Charles Utz (December 2, 1923 – October 30, 2011) was an American surgeon. Utz was the surgeon who removed United States President Ronald Reagan's prostate in 1987.

During his career her wrote 143 articles that appeared in medical journals.

Utz died on October 30, 2011 due to congestive heart failure aged 87.

References

1923 births
2011 deaths
American surgeons
Mayo Clinic people
People from Rochester, Minnesota
Saint Louis University alumni